Dakar International Airport may refer to:
 Blaise Diagne International Airport, a passenger airport opened in 2017 near Diass, Senegal
 Léopold Sédar Senghor International Airport, a cargo and military airport near Yoff, Senegal